Wysoka  is a village in the administrative district of Gmina Leśnica, within Strzelce County, Opole Voivodeship, in south-western Poland. 

Gallery

References

Wysoka